The women's 100 metre freestyle event at the 2008 Olympic Games took place on 13–15 August at the Beijing National Aquatics Center in Beijing, China.

Germany's Britta Steffen blasted a new Olympic record to claim a gold medal in the event. Coming from eighth place in the turn, she posted a time of 53.12 to edge out Australia's world record holder and top favorite Lisbeth Trickett by 0.04 of a second. Swimming in lane eight, Trickett earned a silver with an outside record time of 53.16. She narrowly reached the final as the eighth seed, when China's Pang Jiaying was disqualified for a false start in the semifinals. Meanwhile, U.S. swimmer Natalie Coughlin powered home with a bronze in a matching American record of 53.39 for the second consecutive Olympics. It was Coughlin's fifth medal of these Games, matching her total from Athens four years earlier.

Competing at her third straight Olympics with Steffen, Finland's Hanna-Maria Seppälä finished outside the medals in fourth place at 53.97. Earlier, she posted a top-seeded time of 53.60 from the sixth heat to lead the prelims. She was followed in fifth place by Denmark's Jeanette Ottesen (54.06), and host nation China's Zhu Yingwen, who shared a sixth-place tie with the Netherlands' Marleen Veldhuis in 54.21. Great Britain's Francesca Halsall (54.29) closed out the field.

Records
Prior to this competition, the existing world and Olympic records were as follows.

The following new world and Olympic records were set during this competition.

* Olympic record split from the 4 × 100 m freestyle relay

Results

Heats

Semifinals

Semifinal 1

Semifinal 2

Note: Lisbeth Trickett advanced to the final only when Chinese swimmer Pang Jiaying, who had finished first in the semifinals, was disqualified for a false start.

Final

References

External links
Official Olympic Report

Women's freestyle 100 metre
2008 in women's swimming
Women's events at the 2008 Summer Olympics